Taeli Ramashalane is a Mosotho footballer who currently plays for Lesotho Correctional Services.

Career
The midfielder played previously for Lesotho Prison Service,  Nyenye Rovers and  Lioli FC.

International
Since 2007, he has won three caps for the Lesotho national football team.

Notes

Living people
Association football midfielders
Lesotho footballers
Lesotho international footballers
Lesotho Correctional Services players
Year of birth missing (living people)